Ruth Jeannette Williams is an Australian-born American mathematician at the University of California, San Diego where she holds the Charles Lee Powell Chair as a Distinguished Professor of Mathematics. Her research concerns probability theory and stochastic processes.

Early life and education 
Williams was born in Australia and moved to the United States in 1978.

Williams graduated from the University of Melbourne with a Bachelor of Sciences, with honors, in 1976 and a Master of Science in Mathematics in 1978.  Williams went on to earn her Ph.D. from Stanford University in 1983, under the supervision of Chung Kai-lai.

Recognition 
Williams was president of the Institute of Mathematical Statistics from 2011 to 2012.

Williams is a member of the National Academy of Sciences and a fellow of the American Academy of Arts and Sciences, the American Association for the Advancement of Science, the American Mathematical Society, the Institute of Mathematical Statistics, the Institute for Operations Research and the Management Sciences, and the Society for Industrial and Applied Mathematics. In 1998 she was an Invited Speaker of the International Congress of Mathematicians in Berlin.

Her other awards and honors include:
 Alfred P. Sloan Fellow (1988) 
 Guggenheim Fellow (2001)
 Best Publication Award of the INFORMS Applied Probability Society (2007), jointly with Amber L. Puha and H. Christian Gromoll
John von Neumann Theory Prize (2016), jointly with Martin I. Reiman for "seminal research contributions over the past several decades, to the theory and applications of stochastic networks/systems and their heavy traffic approximations".
Honorary Doctorate from the University of Melbourne (2018) 
 Award for the Advancement of Women in Operations Research and the Management Sciences (2017), annual INFORMS meeting
 Honorary Doctor of Science degree from La Trobe University in Australia
 National Science Foundation Presidential Young Investigator

References

Year of birth missing (living people)
Living people
20th-century American mathematicians
21st-century American mathematicians
American women mathematicians
American statisticians
Women statisticians
Stanford University alumni
University of California, San Diego faculty
Fellows of the American Academy of Arts and Sciences
Fellows of the American Association for the Advancement of Science
Fellows of the American Mathematical Society
Fellows of the Institute of Mathematical Statistics
Fellows of the Institute for Operations Research and the Management Sciences
Fellows of the Society for Industrial and Applied Mathematics
Members of the United States National Academy of Sciences
John von Neumann Theory Prize winners
20th-century women mathematicians
21st-century women mathematicians
Probability theorists
20th-century American women
21st-century American women